Michael D. Muldoon (April 9, 1858 in Westmeath, Ireland, to January 30, 1917) was a Major League Baseball player. Muldoon played for the Cleveland Blues and the Baltimore Orioles.

External links

Baseball-Almanac.com page

Major League Baseball third basemen
Cleveland Blues (NL) players
Baltimore Orioles (AA) players
Major League Baseball players from Ireland
Irish baseball players
Irish emigrants to the United States (before 1923)
1858 births
1917 deaths
Lynn Live Oaks players
Worcester (minor league baseball) players
New Bedford (minor league baseball) players
Albany (minor league baseball) players
New York Metropolitans (minor league) players
Jersey City Skeeters players
Allentown Peanuts players
Birmingham (minor league baseball) players
19th-century baseball players
Sportspeople from County Westmeath